Carsquare is an online automotive meta search engine that provides listings of available vehicles from third-party automotive websites.

Business
Carsquare can be used to locate vehicles currently on the market—new and preowned, for sale and for lease—from multiple automotive sites. The site uses filters such as make, model, condition, price, color, engine type, and proximity to the buyer's ZIP code, in order to narrow down the choices available it then displays matching listings from dealers across the U.S., allowing the user to compare and contrast different vehicles. Carsquare pulls its listings from its network of partners, which includes eBay, Carfax, CarsDirect, MyCarMatch, LotLinx, Usedcars.com, and Swapalease.com.

History 
Carsquare was founded by Khurrum Shakir after leaving AOL in 2010. The company launched in 2012 as iGrabberAutos. It was one of the exhibitors at the 2013 Everywhereelse.co Startup Conference. In May of the same year, the company was nominated and selected by Tech Cocktail (now Tech.Co) as one of "DC’s Hottest Tech Startups." The next month, iGrabberAutos was nominated and selected out of 500+ startups to pitch at the MAVA Capital Connection 2013 Tech Buzz event.

In December 2013, iGrabberAutos was named one of the two winners of the Ballston LaunchPad Challenge, a Virginia-based entrepreneurial initiative dedicated to helping startups obtain funding. Emerging victorious out of a field of 250+ startups, the team was awarded $15,000 in cash; office space in Ballston, Arlington, VA; and legal aid from the law firm Saul Ewing LLP. In the wake of this achievement, the company rebranded itself as Carsquare and has since moved and is now headquartered in Reston, Virginia.

In April 2014, CEO Khurrum Shakir announced the completion of a Series A round of funding, which was led by Robert G. Hisaoka.

Carsquare was an official sponsor of the Unlimited Racing team for the 2014 Pirelli World Challenge Championship. The company served as the primary sponsor of the No 51 TCB Honda Fit, driven by Brian Price.

Partnerships
Carsquare has established business partnerships with a number of companies, including Carfax, CarsDirect, eBay Motors, MyCarMatch, Usedcars.com, LotLinx, and Swapalease.com.

References

Online automotive companies of the United States
Online marketplaces of the United States
Internet properties established in 2013
American companies established in 2013
2013 establishments in Virginia
Companies based in Reston, Virginia